Leslie James Forster (22 July 1915 – 1986) was an English footballer who played as a winger.

Forster started his career with non-league Walker Central before joining Blackpool in 1938, where he made 2 first team appearances. After World War II, Forster joined York City. He scored 2 goals in 10 appearances before leaving to join Gateshead in 1947. Forster made 15 league and cup appearances for Gateshead, scoring 3 goals. Forster joined non-league Blackhall Colliery Welfare in 1948.

Sources

1915 births
1986 deaths
Footballers from Newcastle upon Tyne
English footballers
Association football wingers
Walker Central F.C. players
Blackpool F.C. players
York City F.C. players
Gateshead F.C. players
Blackhall Colliery Welfare F.C. players
English Football League players